The Council for Higher Education in Judea and Samaria was a body which supervised Israeli universities and colleges in the West Bank. Its authority in the West Bank was similar to that of the Council for Higher Education in Israel in Israel proper.

As Israeli law does not apply in the occupied West Bank, the Council for Higher Education in Israel had no legal standing there, so by a military decree a similar institution was formed in the West Bank to regulate the Israeli institutions of higher learning there.

The Council for Higher Education in Judea and Samaria only applied to Israeli institutions and not to Palestinian institutions which also exist in the West Bank.

The Council was abolished in February, 2018, when the Knesset voted to put Ariel University and other West Bank institutions under the control of the same accreditation body as other Israeli colleges and universities.

References

Universities and colleges in Israel
School accreditors
Judea and Samaria Area
2018 disestablishments in Israel
Educational organizations based in Israel
Organizations disestablished in 2018